In Greek mythology, Rhadamanthus or Rhadamanthys was a wise king of Crete. As the son of Zeus and Europa he was considered a demigod. He later became one of the judges of the dead and an important figure in Greek mythology.

His name, whose etymology is obscure, was later used to allude to persons showing stern and inflexible judgement

Family 
Rhadamanthus was, according to mythology, the son of Zeus and Europa and brother to Sarpedon and Minos (also a king and later a judge of the dead). Together with his brother, Rhadamanthus was raised by Asterion, their stepfather. He had two sons, Gortys (associated with Gortyn, Crete) and Erythrus (founder of Erythrae).

Other sources (e.g. Plutarch, Theseus 20) credit Rhadamanthys rather than Dionysus as the husband of Ariadne, and the father of Oenopion, Staphylus and Thoas. In this account, Ariadne was the daughter of Minos, Rhadamanthys' brother; another Ariadne was the daughter of Minos's grandson and namesake, who features in Theseus's legend and was rescued by Dionysus.

Mythology

Legislation

Although he was frequently considered one of the judges of the dead in the underworld, he was also known for a few legislative activities. There is a reference to a law of Rhadamanthus ordering the Cretans to swear oaths by animals and to another law of Rhadamanthus saying if people defend themselves against others who initiated violence then they should suffer no penalty.  His legislation, and its subsequent analogue in Lacadaemonian Sparta, is briefly described in Book I of Plato's Laws, after he is introduced as the brother of Minos, and credited with being the justest of men and an administrator of justice.

Exile from Crete
King Asterius died childless and Minos inherited the throne. When Minos became the king of Crete, he drove Rhadamanthus out of Crete, because he had been jealous of his popularity. Rhadamanthus fled to Boeotia, where he married Alcmene, widow of Amphitryon and mother of Heracles. According to some traditions, he became a tutor to Heracles. This is also mentioned by Tzetzes, a medieval historian.

In general, the particular sphere of activity of Rhadamanthus tends to be the Aegean islands, apart from Crete itself, where Minos was active. He is also often connected by ancient authors with central Greece.

Afterlife 
According to later legends (c. 400 BC), on account of his inflexible integrity he was made one of the judges of the dead in the lower world, together with Aeacus and Minos. He was supposed to judge the souls of easterners, Aeacus those of westerners, while Minos had the casting vote (Plato, Gorgias 524A). He is portrayed in Books 4 and 7 of Homer's Odyssey. Virgil (69–18 BC) makes Rhadamanthus one of the judges and punishers of the unworthy in the Underworld (Tartarus) section of the Aeneid.

Homer represents him as dwelling in the Elysian Fields (Odyssey iv. 564), the paradise for the immortal sons of Zeus. Pindar says that he is the right-hand man of Cronus (now ruling Elysium) and was the sole judge of the dead. Lucian depicts Rhadamanthus as presiding over the company of heroes on the Isles of the Blest in True History.

Argive Genealogy

See also
 Chinvat Bridge, the bridge of the dead in Persian cosmology
 Sraosha, Mithra and Rashnu, guardians and judges of souls in Zoroastrian tradition

Notes

References 

 Apollodorus, The Library with an English Translation by Sir James George Frazer, F.B.A., F.R.S. in 2 Volumes, Cambridge, MA, Harvard University Press; London, William Heinemann Ltd. 1921. ISBN 0-674-99135-4. Online version at the Perseus Digital Library. Greek text available from the same website.

External links

Agenorides
Princes in Greek mythology
Kings of Crete
Kings in Greek mythology
Children of Zeus
Demigods in classical mythology
Underworld gods
Greek judges of the dead
Chthonic beings
Cretan characters in Greek mythology